The Kinks, an English rock band, were active for over three decades between 1964 and 1997, releasing 24 studio and 4 live albums. The first 2 albums are differently released in UK and US partly due to the difference in popularity of the extended play format (the UK market liked it, the US market did not, so US albums had the EP releases bundled onto them), and partly due to the US albums including the hit singles, and the UK albums not; after The Kink Kontroversy in 1965 the albums were the same. There have been somewhere between 100 and 200 compilation albums released worldwide.

Their hit singles included three UK number-one singles, starting in 1964 with "You Really Got Me"; plus 18 Top 40 singles in the 1960s alone and further Top 40 hits in the 1970s and 1980s. The Kinks had five Top 10 singles on the US Billboard chart. Nine of their albums charted in the Top 40. In the UK, the group had seventeen Top 20 singles along with five Top 10 albums. The RIAA has certified four of the Kinks' albums as gold records. The Kinks Greatest Hits!, released in 1966, was certified gold for sales totaling of one million dollars on 28 November 1968—six days after the release of The Kinks Are The Village Green Preservation Society, which failed to chart worldwide. The group would not receive another gold record award until 1979's Low Budget. The 1980 live album One For The Road was certified gold on 8December 1980. Give The People What They Want, released in 1981, received its certification on 25 January 1982, for sales of 500,000 copies. ASCAP, the performing-rights group, presented the Kinks with an award for "One of the Most Played Songs of 1983" for the hit single "Come Dancing".

Albums

Studio albums

 A UK chart position reflects 2018 deluxe reissue. The Kinks Are the Village Green Preservation Society didn't chart on its original release.
 B UK sales certification based on 2008 reissue.

Live albums

Compilations

 B US-only Reprise compilation that combined the UK EP "Kinksize Session", the singles "All Day and All of the Night" and "Tired of Waiting for You", with two tracks that had been dropped from US version of the début album.
 C US-only Reprise compilation that combined the UK EP "Kwyet Kinks" plus other tracks.

Extended plays

Singles

1960s

1970s

1980s

1990s

2000s

2010s

2020s

Music videos

Notes

References

External links
Kinks retrospective review article in Creem magazine including some US charting and sales Information

Discography
Discographies of British artists
Rock music group discographies